Frank Hinman Waskey (April 20, 1875 – January 18, 1964) was a delegate from the District of Alaska to the United States House of Representatives from 1906 to 1907.

Biography 
He was born in Lake City, Minnesota in Wabasha County. He attended the public schools of Minneapolis, moved to Alaska in February 1898, and settled in Nome. He engaged in mining and was the president of a mining company. He was also the director of a bank and a publishing company, both in Nome.

Congress 
He was elected as a Democrat to the Fifty-ninth Congress as the first Delegate from Alaska and served from August 14, 1906, to March 3, 1907. He was not a candidate for renomination in 1906. He prospected for minerals in Alaska and worked as a curio dealer from 1911 to 1955. From 1915 to 1918, he was a United States commissioner at Fortuna Ledge, Alaska.

Later career and death 
He moved to Oakville, Washington in 1956, where he died on January 18, 1964. He was interred in Shelton Cemetery in Shelton, Washington.

External links

 Alaska's Digital Archives - Photo of Waskey meeting U.S. Senator from Alaska, Ernest Gruening, ca. 1961

Delegates to the United States House of Representatives from Alaska Territory
Democratic Party members of the United States House of Representatives from Alaska
20th-century American politicians
Alaska Democrats
People from Nome, Alaska
1875 births
1964 deaths
People from Lake City, Minnesota
American miners
People from Grays Harbor County, Washington